HNLMS Kortenaer was a  of the Royal Netherlands Navy.

Design
The main armament of the ship was three  guns in a double and single turret. Secondary armament included two single  guns and six single  guns.

Service history
The ship was laid down in 1893 at the Rijkswerf in Amsterdam and launched on 27 October 1894. The ship was commissioned on 17 December 1895.

4 February 1896 she and her sister ship  left for practice in the Mediterranean Sea.
On 11 May 1896 during the harbor strikes in Rotterdam a ban on assembly was decreed. Two days later Kortenaer patrolled the Meuse. The ship was later relieved by her sister ships Evertsen,  and the police schooner Argus. 300 grenadiers were deployed during the strikes. The strikes were ended on 21 may.

12 April 1914 the ship was sent from Curaçao to the Mexican coast to protect the complex of the Dutch petrol company La Corona in Tampico  when political tension had risen between Mexico and the USA.

The ships was finally decommissioned in 1920.

Notes

References
Staatsbegrooting voor het dienstjaar 1897 (2.-VI.-5.)

Coastal defence ships of the Royal Netherlands Navy
1894 ships
Ships built in Amsterdam